Paratriarius coccineus is a species of skeletonizing leaf beetle in the family Chrysomelidae. It was first described as Diabrotica coccinea by Joseph Sugar Baly in 1865. It was later treated as a Synbrotica species by Bechyné in 1956, and subsequently listed under genus Paratriarius in the last world catalogue of Galerucinae. A syntype of the species is held in the collections of the Natural History Museum in London.

References 

Galerucinae
Beetles described in 1865
Taxa named by Joseph Sugar Baly